Denmark competed at the 1992 Summer Olympics in Barcelona, Spain. 110 competitors, 77 men and 33 women, took part in 67 events in 14 sports.

Medalists

Competitors
The following is the list of number of competitors in the Games.

Archery

Denmark had very little success in the 1992 archery competition, losing all three head-to-head matches.

Men's Individual Competition:
 Ole Gammelgaard — Round of 32, 26th place (0–1)
 Henrik Toft — Round of 32, 27th place (0–1)
 Jan Rytter — Ranking Round, 64th place (0–0)

Men's Team Competition:
 Gammelgaard, Toft, and Rytter — Round of 16, 13th place (0–1)

Athletics

Women's 3.000 metres
Gitte Karlshøj
 Heat — 8:54.05 (→ did not advance)

Women's 10.000 metres
Dorthe Rasmussen
 Heat — 33:22.43 (→ did not advance)

Women's Long Jump
 Renata Nielsen 
 Heat — 6.63 m
 Final — 6.06 m (→ 11th place)

Badminton

Boxing

Canoeing

Cycling

Eleven cyclists, nine men and two women, represented Denmark in 1992.

Men's road race
 Lars Michaelsen
 Christian Andersen
 Claus Michael Møller

Men's individual pursuit
 Jan Petersen

Men's team pursuit
 Ken Frost
 Jimmi Madsen
 Jan Petersen
 Klaus Kynde Nielsen
 Michael Sandstød

Men's points race
 Dan Frost

Women's road race
 Karina Skibby — 2:05:03 (→ 11th place)

Women's individual pursuit
 Hanne Malmberg

Equestrianism

Football

Men's team competition
Preliminary round (group B)
 Drew with Mexico (1–1)
 Drew with Ghana (0–0)
 Lost to Australia (0–3)
 → Did not advance
 Team roster (club teams in brackets)
 Niels Christian Jørgensen (Aalborg BK)
 Thomas Helveg (Odense BK)
 Jacob Laursen (Vejle BK)
 Claus Thomsen (Aarhus GF)
 Peter Frank (BK Frem)
 Jakob Kjeldbjerg (Silkeborg IF)
 Jens Christian Madsen (Brøndby IF)
 Ronnie Ekelund (Brøndby IF)
 Miklos Molnar (Servette FC)
 Per Frandsen (OSC Lille)
 Peter Møller (Aalborg BK)
 Unused: Jens Risager (Brøndby IF)
 Stig Tøfting (Aarhus GF)
 Lars Højer Nielsen (F.C. Copenhagen)
 Unused: Michael Hansen (Silkeborg IF)
 Unused: Brian Flies (Næstved IF)
 Jens Christian Mosegaard Madsen (Odense BK)
 Michael Larsen (Silkeborg IF)
 Søren Andersen (Aarhus GF)
 Unused: Michael Johansen (F.C. Copenhagen)
Head coach: Viggo Jensen

Rowing

Sailing

Men

Women

Open

Match racing

Shooting

Swimming

Men's 50m Freestyle
 Franz Mortensen
 Heat — 23.61 (→ did not advance, 29th place)

Men's 100m Freestyle
 Franz Mortensen
 Heat — 51.29 (→ did not advance, 26th place)

Men's 200m Freestyle
 Franz Mortensen
 Heat — 1:53.86 (→ did not advance, 32nd place)

Men's 200m Backstroke
 Lars Sørensen
 Heat — 2:06.80 (→ did not advance, 36th place)

Men's 100m Breaststroke
 Lars Sørensen
 Heat — 1:07.94 (→ did not advance, 48th place)

Men's 200m Individual Medley
 Lars Sørensen
 Heat — 2:04.65
 B-Final — 2:03.81 (→ 11th place)

Women's 50m Freestyle
 Gitta Jensen
 Heat — 26.54 (→ did not advance, 18th place)
 Mette Nielsen
 Heat — 26.80 (→ did not advance, 25th place)

Women's 100m Freestyle
 Gitta Jensen
 Heat — 56.47
 B-Final — 56.59 (→ 12th place)
 Mette Nielsen
 Heat — 58.67 (→ did not advance, 27th place)

Women's 200m Freestyle
 Mette Jacobsen
 Heat — 2:01.84
 B-Final — 2:02.14 (→ 13th place)
 Gitta Jensen
 Heat — 2:02.27
 B-Final — 2:02.32 (→ 14th place)

Women's 400m Freestyle
 Mette Jacobsen
 Heat — 4:16.80 (→ did not advance, 13th place)

Women's 100m Breaststroke
 Britta Vestergaard
 Heat — 1:13.58 (→ did not advance, 27th place)

Women's 200m Breaststroke
 Britta Vestergaard
 Heat — 2:35.28 (→ did not advance, 21st place)

Women's 100m Butterfly
 Berit Puggaard
 Heat — 1:04.57 (→ did not advance, 38th place)

Women's 200m Butterfly
 Mette Jacobsen
 Heat — 2:13.18
 Final — 2:11.87 (→ 7th place)
 Berit Puggaard
 Heat — 2:16.11 
 B-Final — 2:15.07 (→ 15th place)

Women's 200m Individual Medley
 Annette Poulsen
 Heat — 2:25.67 (→ did not advance, 35th place)

Women's 4 × 100 m Freestyle Relay
 Gitta Jensen, Mette Jacobsen, Berit Puggaard, Mette Nielsen, and Annette Poulsen
 Heat — 3:48.78
 Final — 3:47.81 (→ 6th place)

Women's 4 × 100 m Medley Relay
 Mette Jacobsen, Britta Vestergaard, Berit Puggaard, and Gitta Jensen
 Heat — 4:17.20 (→ did not advance, 11th place)

Tennis

Weightlifting

References

Nations at the 1992 Summer Olympics
1992
Summer Olympics